The Hamburg Rules are a set of rules governing the international shipment of goods, resulting from the United Nations International Convention on the Carriage of Goods by Sea adopted in Hamburg on 31 March 1978. The Convention was an attempt to form a uniform legal base for the transportation of goods on oceangoing ships. A driving force behind the convention was the attempt by developing countries' to provide all participants a fair and equal chance of succeeding. It came into force on 1 November 1992.

History
The first of the international conventions on the carriage of goods by sea was the Hague Rules of 1924.   In 1968, the Hague Rules  were updated to become the Hague-Visby Rules, but the changes were modest. The convention still covered only "tackle to tackle" carriage contracts, with no provision for multimodal transport. The industry-changing phenomenon of containerization was barely acknowledged.  The 1978 Hamburg Rules were introduced to provide a framework that was both more modern, and less biased in favour of ship-operators.  Although the Hamburg Rules were readily adopted by developing countries, they were shunned by richer countries who stuck with Hague and  Hague-Visby. It had been expected that a Hague/Hamburg compromise might arise, but instead the more extensive Rotterdam Rules appeared.

Relation with other conventions
Article 31 of the Hamburg Convention covers its entry into force,  coupled to denunciation of other Rules. Within five years after entry into force of the Hamburg Rules, ratifying states must denounce earlier conventions, specifically the Hague and Hague-Visby Rules.

A long-standing aim has been to have a uniform set of rules to govern carriage of goods, but there are now five different sets: Hague, Hague-Visby, Hague-Visby/SDR, Hamburg and Rotterdam.  (The Rotterdam Rules are not yet in force).

Ratifications
As of March 2021, the convention had been ratified by 35 countries:

References

External links
Convention text 
Ratifications and signatures

Admiralty law treaties
United Nations treaties
Treaties concluded in 1978
Treaties entered into force in 1992
International transport
Treaties of Albania
Treaties of Austria
Treaties of Barbados
Treaties of Botswana
Treaties of Burkina Faso
Treaties of Burundi
Treaties of Cameroon
Treaties of Chile
Treaties of the Czech Republic
Treaties of the Dominican Republic
Treaties of Egypt
Treaties of the Gambia
Treaties of Georgia (country)
Treaties of Guinea
Treaties of the Hungarian People's Republic
Treaties of Jordan
Treaties of Kazakhstan
Treaties of Kenya
Treaties of Lebanon
Treaties of Lesotho
Treaties of Liberia
Treaties of Malawi
Treaties of Morocco
Treaties of Nigeria
Treaties of Paraguay
Treaties of Peru
Treaties of the Socialist Republic of Romania
Treaties of Senegal
Treaties of Sierra Leone
Treaties of Saint Vincent and the Grenadines
Treaties of Syria
Treaties of Tunisia
Treaties of Uganda
Treaties of Tanzania
Treaties of Zambia
1978 in West Germany
1978 in New York City

de:Haager Regeln#Weitere Entwicklung (Hamburg- und Rotterdam-Regeln)